The Gandhi Global Family medals and awards are awards offered by the Gandhi Global Family for contributions to society.

Gandhi Global Family (GGF) Medals/Awards

Mahatma Gandhi Awards 

The Mahatma Gandhi Award is the highest award conferred by the Gandhi Global Family. This award is named in honour of Mahatma Gandhi, leader of the movement for Indian independence. The recipients of the Mahatma Gandhi Award are the Indian Air Force and Indian Army for their work of rehabilitation and resettlement of Jammu and Kashmir State after the devastating 2005 Kashmir earthquake and Jain Acharya Samrat Dr Shiv Muni ji Maharaj of Sthanakvasi for promoting universal peace and brotherhood.

Mahatma Gandhi Seva Medal 

The Mahatma Gandhi Seva Medal is the second highest award. It is awarded to individuals and organizations to recognize outstanding services provided to impoverished segments. Notable recipients of the Mahatma Gandhi Seva Medal include the Dalai Lama, then President of India Shri K R Narayanan, UPA Chairperson & President of INC Smt Sonia Gandhi, Speaker Lok Sabha Smt Meira Kumar, Former Odissa Chief Minister and present Assam Governor Janaki Ballabh Patnaik, Former Indian Army Chief and Arunachal Pradesh Governor Joginder Jaswant Singh, YHAI President Shri Dr. Harish Saxena, Satguru Madhu Paramhans from Sahib Bandgi, Thai Monk Ven Phrarajabhavanavisudh, Secretary General, Saarclaw Hemant Batra.

Nirankari Baba Hardev Singh Ji representing Sant Nirankari Mission received this medal on 26 November 2013. Pujya Gurudevshri Rakeshbhai, founder of Shrimad Rajchandra Mission Dharampur and the NGO Shrimad Rajchandra Love and Care was the recipient in 2017.

Brand Ambassador 

Brand Ambassador is the third highest award.

Gandhi Doot Medal 

The Gandhi Doot Medal is the fourth highest award. It is awarded to a student or a student organization that has demonstrably excelled in youth development and social services.

References 

Indian awards